Henry Eckford may refer to:

People 
Henry Eckford (horticulturist) (1823–1905), British horticulturist
Henry Eckford (shipbuilder) (1775–1832), Scottish-born American shipbuilder and naval architect

Ships 
Henry Eckford (steamboat), American commercial steamboat in service from 1824 to 1841; the first steam vessel to be powered by a compound engine
, a fleet replenishment oiler of the United States Navy launched in 1989 but never completed and sold for scrapping in 2011

Eckford, Henry